Felipe Buencamino y Siojo (August 23, 1848 – February 6, 1929) was an infamous Filipino turncoat, lawyer, diplomat, and politician. He fought alongside the Spaniards in the Philippine Revolution but later switched sides and joined Emilio Aguinaldo's revolutionary cabinet. He was a member of the Malolos Congress and co-authored the Malolos Constitution. He was also appointed as Secretary of Foreign Relations in the cabinet of Aguinaldo. After he left the revolutionary government, he co-founded the Federal Party and became a founding member of the Philippine Independent Church.

Early life
He was born in San Miguel, Bulacan to Victor Buencamino and Petrona Siojo.  Before the Hispanization of the Philippine natives, his surname was Magalingdaan. Felipe studied at the University of Santo Tomas, where he obtained his A.B. degree with honors. He also received a diploma in law from the same university in 1884.

Career

After he earned his law degree, he went to work for the Manila Audencia (court). In 1886, he was appointed fiscal and then judge of Batanes, and in 1888, he was appointed judge of Tayabas. During the revolution, he fought under the Spanish flag, rising through the ranks to become a colonel in the Spanish army. However, after the failed Pact of Biak-na-Bato and the resumption of the revolution, he was accused of being a spy and was imprisoned in Cavite City. When he was freed, he immediately joined the revolutionary movement and fought in the battles of Kamansi and Mount Arayat.

When 270 Spanish navy infantry prisoners were handed to General Aguinaldo at Teatro Caviteño following the Battle of Alapan at Imus on May 28, 1898, he was being held in the tower of the Osorio family estate in Cavite Puerto for being accused of being a spy. He was present when the Philippine flag was first unfurled. General Tomas Mascardo stayed in charge of Buencamino until June 6, 1898. However, he was present for the declaration of Philippine independence in Kawit on June 12, 1898. He later served as a delegate to the Malolos Congress, In September 26, 1898, Emilio Aguinaldo named Buencamino as secretario de fomento (in English: Secretary of Development).

The First Philippine Republic was inaugurated on January 23, 1899. By February, Filipinos found themselves at war with their erstwhile American ally. The war was triggered by the February 4 killing of a Filipino corporal in Santa Mesa, Manila by an American sentry and the massive attack against Filipino troops the next day. He investigated the incident through the orders of Aguinaldo. His report put the blame squarely on the occupying American forces. Yet by May 1899, Buencamino was among those lobbying for the acceptance of American rule.

United States Secretary of State John Hay had sent a telegram to the Schurman Commission enabling it to offer the Filipinos autonomy under American authority, but Mabini was against it and favored independence under American protection. Buencamino, Pedro Paterno, and other powerful Malolos Congress members passed a resolution requesting that Aguinaldo disavow Mabini's position and remove him as prime minister. Under duress, Aguinaldo formed a new cabinet. Paterno replaced Mabini, while Buencamino was promoted as Secretary of Foreign Relations and concurrently the Secretary of Welfare.

In one of their cabinet meetings, General Antonio Luna allegedly slapped Buencamino and called him a coward. He and Luna had another confrontation in Cabanatuan on June 5, 1899, just before Luna and his aide Colonel Francisco Roman were killed, and Eduardo Rusca, one of Luna's aides was arrested.

When Buencamino and Paterno formed a group known as the "Pacificados" and organized the Asociación de Paz (League for Peace), the Philippine–American War was still raging. The goal was to aid General Elwell Otis' pacification campaign and clear the way for American authority. Among its prominent members were Trinidad Pardo de Tavera, Leon Ma. Guerrero, Cayetano Arellano, Rafael Palma, Tomas del Rosario, Justo Lukban and Pascual H. Poblete. In December 1900, the league changed its name to Partido Federal whose aim was statehood for the Philippines. The party dominated politics for a while until 1907 when their opponents, the Nacionalistas who advocated independence took control of the Philippine Assembly. Buencamino died on February 6, 1929.

Personal life
Buencamino was married to Juana Arnedo and had ten children. After she died in 1883, Buencamino married Guadalupe Salazar Abreu, who had three sons, Victor, Felipe Jr., and Philip.

In popular culture 
 Portrayed by Joonee Gamboa in the film El Presidente (2012).
 Portrayed by Nonie Buencamino in the film Heneral Luna (2015).
 Portrayed by Nonie Buencamino in the film Goyo: The Boy General (2018).

References 

1848 births
1929 deaths
Aguinaldo administration cabinet members
Filipino propagandists
People from Bulacan
People of the Philippine–American War
People of the Philippine Revolution
Members of the Malolos Congress
Tagalog people
University of Santo Tomas alumni
Members of the Philippine Independent Church